Switzerland competed at the 2011 Summer Universiade in Shenzhen, China.

Medalists

Volleyball

Switzerland has qualified a men's team.

References

Nations at the 2011 Summer Universiade
2011 in Swiss sport
Switzerland at the Summer Universiade